The Tunisia women's national under-18 and under-19 basketball team, nicknamed Les Aigles de Carthage (The Eagles of Carthage or The Carthage Eagles), is a national basketball team of Tunisia, administered by the Tunisia Basketball Federation (FTBB). 
It represents the country in international under-18 and under-19 (under age 18 and under age 19) women's basketball competitions.

Competitive record
 Champions   Runners-up   Third place   Fourth place

Red border color indicates tournament was held on home soil.

FIBA Under-19 Women's Basketball World Cup

FIBA Africa Under-18 Championship for Women

See also
Tunisia women's national basketball team
Tunisia women's national under-20 basketball team
Tunisia women's national under-17 basketball team
Tunisia men's national under-19 basketball team

References

External links
 Archived records of Tunisia team participations

Basketball in Tunisia
Basketball teams in Tunisia
Women's national under-19 basketball teams
Basketball